Timothy Donald Anderson (16 October 1925 – 22 September 2017) was a British pole vaulter who competed in the 1952 Summer Olympics. He also represented England and won a gold medal in pole vault at the 1950 British Empire Games in Auckland, New Zealand.

References

1925 births
2017 deaths
People from Croydon
Athletes from London
British male pole vaulters
Commonwealth Games gold medallists for England
Athletes (track and field) at the 1950 British Empire Games
Olympic athletes of Great Britain
Athletes (track and field) at the 1952 Summer Olympics
Commonwealth Games medallists in athletics
20th-century British people
Medallists at the 1950 British Empire Games